The Belarus men's national tennis team represented Belarus in Davis Cup tennis competition until it was suspended in 2022, due to the 2022 Russian invasion of Ukraine. They are governed by the Belarus Tennis Association. In 2007, Belarus were defeated in the 2007 Davis Cup World Group Play-offs by Peru, and therefore was relegated from the World Group.

Belarus was suspended in 2022, due to the 2022 Russian invasion of Ukraine.

History
Belarus competed in its first Davis Cup in 1994, but at least one Belarusian player (Sergey Leonyuk) had previously represented the Soviet Union.

Belarus was suspended in 2022, due to the 2022 Russian invasion of Ukraine.

Last team (2022) 

 Ilya Ivashka
 Egor Gerasimov
 Martin Borisiouk
 Erik Arutiunian
 Andrei Vasilevski

Performances
Here is the list of all match-ups since 1994.

1990s

2000s

2010s

See also
Davis Cup
Belarus Fed Cup team

References

External links

Davis Cup teams
Davis
Davis Cup